The Jacksonville Tea Men were a soccer team based in Jacksonville, Florida, United States. Overall, the Tea Men played a total of four seasons in Jacksonville, first in the major league-level North American Soccer League (NASL) from 1980–1982, then in the lower level American Soccer League and United Soccer League from 1982–1984. The NASL incarnation of the club was Jacksonville's first professional soccer team, and the first major league-level sport franchise ever based in the city.

The team originated as the New England Tea Men, based in Foxborough, Massachusetts, retaining their Boston Tea Party-themed name after moving to Jacksonville. They played both outdoor and indoor soccer, with the Gator Bowl Stadium and the Jacksonville Coliseum serving as their home fields. Though they performed well on the field in their first year, they were ultimately unable to overcome the financial difficulties that had plagued them since New England, and were disbanded by the NASL after the 1981–1982 season. A new owner brought the Tea Men into the minor league-level American Soccer League the next season, where they won the 1983 ASL Championship. They moved into the new United Soccer League in 1983, but financial pressures caused the team to fold after the end of the season.

History
The team originated as the New England Tea Men, who joined the North American Soccer League (NASL) as an expansion team for the 1978–1979 season. Their owner was the tea company Lipton, who gave the team its unusual name in reference to the Boston Tea Party. In their first season the Tea Men had a contract to play at Foxboro Stadium in Foxborough, Massachusetts, home of the New England Patriots National Football League (NFL) team. The team made the league playoffs and sold well in their first season, but were forced out of their stadium the next year, and sales declined precipitously. They were able to return to Foxboro 1980, but under a new, restrictive lease that forced them to play many games at off times. Ticket sales plummeted even further, and Lipton decided to relocate the team to Jacksonville, Florida.

As such, Jacksonville got its first ever professional soccer team, as well as its first major league-level team in any sport. Lipton, which had already lost $1 million on its franchise, decided to retain the Tea Men name, not wanting to lose the marketing tie-in or spend any further money on rebranding. Many commentators, and even the players themselves, noted the name made no sense in a Florida city with no connection to tea, but it stuck regardless. The team's indoor games were played at Jacksonville Coliseum, while their outdoor games were played at the Gator Bowl Stadium.

The Tea Men entered the playoffs in their first year in Jacksonville, advancing to the conference semifinals. However, despite drawing strong crowds to their first games, peaking with a crowd of 17,128 at their first outdoor game, attendance waned later in the season, eventually dropping to around 10,000. Lipton, which announced that it had lost $2 million since the relocation decided to pull out. At the urging of mayor Jake Godbold, a group of Jacksonville investors raised funds to lease the team from Lipton and keep it operating the next season. However, the team struggled through the year on and off the field, finishing dead last in the NASL and drawing an average of only 7,160 fans per game, the second worst in the league. The NASL disbanded the struggling franchise.

However, Jacksonville businessman Ingo Krieg took over the Tea Men, with the intention of keeping the club alive in the minor leagues. The Tea Men joined the American Soccer League (ASL) for the 1983 season. There they found immediate success, going on to win the 1983 league championship. However, Krieg became concerned about that the ASL was not financially solvent, and withdrew the team to join the new United Soccer League. The Tea Men played through the season, but were unable to overcome their lingering financial difficulties. They folded before the beginning of the 1985 season, marking the end of the franchise.

During their time in the NASL the Tea Men's coach was Irishman Noel Cantwell, former manager of Coventry City (1967–1972) and Peterborough United (1972–1977). The assistant coach was Dennis Viollet, former player for Manchester United. Viollet remained in Jacksonville, where he coached the minor league Tea Men and later, the Jacksonville University Dolphins men's college soccer team. Notable players include goalkeeper Arnie Mausser, midfielder Archie Gemmill and strikers Alan Green and Ricardo Alonso.

Year-by-year

All-time results
NASL regular Season: 29–35–0
NASL Playoffs: 3–2

Honors
League Goal Scoring Champion
1982 Ricardo Alonso (21 goals)
League Leading Goaltender
 1981 Arnie Mausser (GAA: 1.21)
NASL All-Stars
1981 Alan Green, Honorable Mention
1982 Ricardo Alonso, 1st Team
U.S. Soccer Hall of Fame
2003 Arnie Mausser
Participations in CONCACAF Champions' Cup: 1984

ASL/USL

Year-by-year

Honors (ASL)
ASL MVP
1983 – Peter Simonini

ASL ROOKIE OF THE YEAR
1983 – Matt English

Players (ASL)
  Ringo Cantillo (1984)
 Matt English (1983) 11 Goals
 Poli Garcia (1983) 9 Goals
  John Lignos (1984)
  Peter Ioanou (1983) 2 Goals
  Robert Maum (1983)
  Steve Ralbovsky (1983)
 Peter Simonini (1983) 24 Apps 0 Goals
 Nino Zec (1983) 6 Goals
  Micky Zivaljevic (1983) 16 Goals

References

External links
The Year in American Soccer – 1983

American Soccer League (1933–1983) teams
Defunct indoor soccer clubs in the United States
Defunct soccer clubs in Florida
North American Soccer League (1968–1984) teams
Sports teams in Jacksonville, Florida
United Soccer League (1984–85) teams
1980 establishments in Florida
1984 disestablishments in Florida
Soccer clubs in Florida
Association football clubs established in 1980
Association football clubs disestablished in 1984
U.S. clubs in CONCACAF Champions' Cup